Agus Gumiwang Kartasasmita (born 3 January 1969) is an Indonesian politician. He is the current Minister of Industry in the Republic of Indonesia, appointed on 24 August 2019.

Early life, and education 
Agus Kartasasmita was born on 3 January 1969 in Jakarta, Indonesia. His father is Ginandjar Kartasasmita a former Speaker of Indonesia Regional Representative Council. Kartasasmita attended Canisius High School in 1984 and left in 1985 to Knox High School in New York. In 1991, he went to Pacific Western University where he studied Commercial Science and graduated in 1994 with a BSc in Commercial science. In 2007, he enrolled into University of Pasundan where he graduated with Master of Public Administration in 2009, and obtained a PhD in Administration in 2014.

Political career

People's Representative Council 
Agus Kartasasmita began his political career when he was elected into the People's Representative Council of Indonesia in 1998 and served till 2004. While serving as member  of parliament he was a member of Commission I of the Parliament. In 2009 he was re-elected into the Legislative Assembly, during his tenure he served as Chairman of the Working Committee of the State Intelligence Bill, International Treaties Committee Chairman Bill, Chairman of the Special Committee for National Security Bill and Vice Chairman of Commission I respectively until 2014.

In 2014, he was re-elected into People's Representative Council of Indonesia. He is a member of the Commission XI of the House of Representative. In early 2015, he was appointed Secretary of Golkar Party faction in People's Representative Council.

Minister of Social Affairs and Industry 
On 24 August 2018, he was appointed Minister of Social Affairs by President Joko Widodo. On October 23 2019, president elect Jokowi announced that Agus Gumiwang would make a return to his Indonesia Onward Cabinet as Minister of Industry replacing Gumiwang's fellow Golkar Party politician, Airlangga Hartarto.

References

External links 
 Agus Gumiwang Kartasasmita

Living people
1969 births
People from Jakarta
Industry ministers of Indonesia
Working Cabinet (Joko Widodo)
California Miramar University alumni
Onward Indonesia Cabinet
Members of the People's Representative Council, 2009
Members of the People's Representative Council, 2014
Social affairs ministers of Indonesia
Sundanese people